Yasmin Abbasey is a Pakistani Judge, serving in the Sindh High Court. She is one of only two women serving on the court at this time. Justice Abbasey has previously served as a Judge in the lower courts. Since her elevation to the High Court, most of Justice Abbasey's reported cases have been in Criminal Law, although she has extensive experience in Administrative Law, having served in Administrative Tribunals while serving as a puisne judge.
She was previously serving as Federal Law Secretary. Presently she is the Federal Ombudsman for Harassment of Women and Men at Work Place under the Harassment at Work Place Act, 2010.

References

Living people
Pakistani women judges
1950 births